Boloria freija, the Freija fritillary, is a butterfly of the family Nymphalidae with a circumboreal distribution. It occurs in bogs and tundra. Its range includes Northern Europe to the north of 60° N, occasionally more southern locations, the Urals, Siberia, the Russian Far East, mountains of northern Mongolia and Hokkaido, as well as North America, extending in the Rocky Mountains to 35° N.

Description

A. freija Thnbg. (— lapponica Esp., tullia O., freya Godt.) (68c). Upperside almost exactly as in dia, the size also being the same. The hindwing beneath resembles that of chariclea, but is more variegated, with a distinct silvery white band between the central and marginal areas; a large rhomboidal silver-spot in the centre of the costa and rather long silver-spots at the margin.

Biology
Larvae feed on Rubus chamaemorus, Dryas sp., Vaccinium uliginosum, Arctostaphylos alpina, A. uva-ursi, Empetrum nigrum, Rhododendron aureum, Rh. lapponicum. The species produces one generation every two years.

References

freija
Butterflies of Europe
Butterflies of Asia
Butterflies of North America
Butterflies described in 1791